Christmas Symphony is the twelfth Christmas music album overall released by American musical group Mannheim Steamroller. The album was originally released in 2011. Recorded in Prague, the album features members of the Czech Philharmonic Orchestra, performing new recordings of previously released Mannheim Steamroller arrangements.

Track listing
 Deck the Halls - 3:40
 Greensleeves - 3:27
 Little Drummer Boy - 4:02
 The Holly and the Ivy - 3:03
 Cantique de Noël (O Holy Night) - 5:26
 Hark! The Herald Trumpets Sing Fanfare - 1:27
 Hark! The Herald Angels Sing - 3:30
 Gagliarda - 2:32
 In Dulci Jubilo - 2:46
 Wassail, Wassail - 2:20
 Carol of the Birds - 2:03
 I Saw Three Ships - 1:28
 God Rest Ye, Merry Gentlemen - 1:41
 God Rest Ye, Merry Gentlemen (Rock) - 4:38
 Angels We Have Heard on High - 4:04
 Stille Nacht (Silent Night) - 5:11
 Tracks 8-13 are grouped on the cover as 'Renaissance Suite'

Charts

Weekly charts

Year-end charts

References

2011 Christmas albums
Mannheim Steamroller albums
Christmas albums by American artists
American Gramaphone albums
American Gramaphone Christmas albums
Classical Christmas albums
New-age Christmas albums